Mendy Meenderink (born 21 April 1983) is a Dutch Paralympic swimmer. She represented the Netherlands at the 2000 Summer Paralympics held in Sydney, Australia and at the 2008 Summer Paralympics held in Beijing, China. She won the bronze medal in the women's 100 metre freestyle S9 event at the 2000 Summer Paralympics in Sydney, Australia.

References

External links 
 

Living people
1983 births
Place of birth missing (living people)
Dutch female freestyle swimmers
Swimmers at the 2000 Summer Paralympics
Swimmers at the 2008 Summer Paralympics
Paralympic bronze medalists for the Netherlands
Paralympic medalists in swimming
Medalists at the 2000 Summer Paralympics
Paralympic swimmers of the Netherlands
S9-classified Paralympic swimmers
21st-century Dutch women